Damnatio memoriae was the ancient Roman practice of erasing the names of disgraced individuals from public memory. The emperors listed below were erased from monuments by decree of the Roman Senate.

List

See also
 List of Roman usurpers
 List of Roman emperors
 List of Roman and Byzantine empresses
 List of Augustae

References

Sources
 Sir John Edwin Sandys – Latin Epigraphy (1927). 

Lists of Roman people